Obeliscus is a genus of air-breathing land snails, terrestrial pulmonate gastropod mollusks in the subfamily Stenogyrinae of the family Achatinidae.

Distribution 
Species within this genus occur in Brazil, Cuba,...

Species 
The genus Obeliscus includes the following species:
 Obeliscus abbotti Vanatta, 1918
 Obeliscus acicularis Aguayo & Jaume, 1957
 Obeliscus agassizi Pilsbry, 1906
 Obeliscus angustatus (Gundlach, 1856)
 Obeliscus bacillus (Pfeiffer, 1861)
 Obeliscus bacterionides (d’Orbigny, 1835)
 Obeliscus basilissa Aguayo & Jaume, 1954
 Obeliscus binneyi Pilsbry, 1906
 Obeliscus blandianus Pilsbry, 1906
 Obeliscus boitata Simone & Salvador, 2016
 Obeliscus carphodes (Pfeiffer, 1852)
 Obeliscus clavus
 Obeliscus clavus flavus Pilsbry, 1906
 Obeliscus columella (Philippi, 1844)
 Obeliscus gonostoma (Gundlach in Pfeiffer, 1863)
 Obeliscus gundlachi (Pfeiffer, 1863)
 Obeliscus homalogyrus (Shuttleworth in Pfeiffer, 1851)
 Obeliscus lata Gundlach in Pilsbry, 1905
 Obeliscus latispira Pilsbry, 1944
 Obeliscus maximus (Poey, 1854)
 Obeliscus microstoma (Gundlach in Pfeiffer, 1863)
 Obeliscus moderatus Pilsbry, 1933
 Obeliscus obeliscus (Moricand, 1833)
 Obeliscus paradoxus (Arango, 1881)
 Obeliscus pattalus Pilsbry, 1906
 Obeliscus peregrinus (Pfeiffer, 1855)
 Obeliscus petricola Aguayo & Jaume, 1957
 Obeliscus planospirus (Pfeiffer, 1852)
 Obeliscus saugeti Aguayo & Jaume, 1957
 Obeliscus strictus (Poey, 1853)
 Obeliscus subuliformis (Moricand, 1836)
 Obeliscus swiftianus (Pfeiffer, 1852)
 Obeliscus sylvaticus (Spix, 1827)
 Obeliscus virescens (Da Costa, 1898)
Species brought into synonymy
 Obeliscus blandi (L. Pfeiffer, 1854): synonym of Coeliaxis blandi (L. Pfeiffer, 1854)
 Obeliscus brunneus A. Adams, 1854: synonym of Colsyrnola brunnea (A. Adams, 1854)
 Obeliscus cuneus (L. Pfeiffer, 1852): synonym of Protobeliscus cuneus (L. Pfeiffer, 1852) (basionym)
 Obeliscus jousseaumei Cousin, 1887: synonym of Protobeliscus jousseaumei (Cousin, 1887)
 Obeliscus lymneaeformis Melvill & Ponsonby, 1901: synonym of Euonyma lymneaeformis (Melvill & Ponsonby, 1901) (original combination)
 Obeliscus natalensis Burnup, 1905: synonym of Euonyma natalensis (Burnup, 1905) (original combination)
 Obeliscus octogyrus (L. Pfeiffer, 1856): synonym of Stenogyra octogyra (L. Pfeiffer, 1856) (superseded combination)
 Obeliscus terebraster (Lamarck, 1822): synonym of Stenogyra terebraster (Lamarck, 1822) (unaccepted combination)
 Obeliscus tessellatus A. Adams, 1854: synonym of Longchaeus maculosus (Lamarck, 1822)
 Obeliscus triptyx (Pilsbry, 1907): synonym of Ischnocion triptyx (Pilsbry, 1907)

See also 
 Obeliscus Gray, 1847 is a synonym of Pyramidella
 Obeliscus Popofsky, 1913 is a genus of protist

References 

Subulininae